Pawon (known locally as Candi Pawon) is a Buddhist temple in Central Java, Indonesia.

History 
Located between two other Buddhist temples, Borobudur ( to the northeast) and Mendut ( to the southwest), Pawon is connected with the other two temples, all of which were built during the Sailendra dynasty (8th–9th centuries). Examines the detail and style of its carving this temple is slightly older than Borobudur.

The three temples were located on a straight line, suggesting there was a symbolic meaning that binds these temples.

"Between Mendut and Borobudur stands Pawon temple, a jewel of Javanese temple architecture. Most probably, this temple served to purify the mind prior to ascending Borobudur."  

The original name of this Buddhist shrine is uncertain. Pawon literally means "kitchen" in Javanese language, which is derived from the root word awu or dust. The connection to the word "dust" also suggests that this temple was probably built as a tomb or mortuary temple for a king. Pawon from the word Per-awu-an (place that contains dust), a temple that houses the dust or ashes of cremated king. However who was the personage that entombed here is still unknown. Local people name this temple as "Bajranalan" based on the name of the village. Bajranalan is derived from the sanskrit word Vajra (thunder or also a Buddhist ceremonial tool) and Anala (fire, flame). 

In the contemporary era during the full moon in May or June, Buddhist community in Indonesia observe Waisak and participate in the annual procession by walking from Mendut passing through Pawon and ends at Borobudur.

Architecture 

The temple slightly faces northwest and stands on a square base. Each sides of the stairs and the top of the gates are adorned with carved Kala-Makara, commonly found in classic Javanese temples. The outer wall of Pawon is carved with reliefs of boddhisattvas and taras. There are also reliefs of kalpataru (tree of life), flanked between Kinnara-Kinnari. The square chamber inside is empty with a square basin in the center of it. Rectangular small windows were found, probably for ventilation.

The roof section of is crowned with five small stupas and four small ratnas. Because of its relative simplicity, symmetry and harmony, the historians dubbed this small temple as "the jewel of Javanese temple architecture", in contrast with tall-slender East Javanese style counterparts as found in later Singhasari and Majapahit period.

See also 

 Ancient temples of Java
 Buddhism in Indonesia
 Candi of Indonesia
 Borobudur
 Mendut
 Ngawen

References

External links 

9th-century Buddhist temples
Archaeological sites in Indonesia
Buddhist temples in Indonesia
Shailendra dynasty
Borobudur
Cultural Properties of Indonesia in Central Java
Religious buildings and structures in Central Java

ru:Павон